Port-au-Prince is an arrondissement in the Ouest department of Haiti. It had 2,109,516 inhabitants at the 2003 Census which was estimated to have risen to 2,759,991 in 2015 in an area of 735.78 sq km (284.09 sq mi). Postal codes in the Port-au-Prince Arrondissement start with the number 61.

Communes

The arondissement consists of the following communes:
 Port-au-Prince
 Carrefour
 Cité Soleil
 Delmas
 Gressier
 Kenscoff
 Pétion-Ville
 Tabarre

History

2010 7.0 earthquake

On 12 January 2010, a magnitude 7.0 earthquake struck in the arrondissement, the largest in Haiti in two centuries. The city of Port-au-Prince suffered much damage, and estimates of upwards of 50,000 deaths, with many facilities destroyed. In Pétion-Ville, the earthquake collapsed a hospital in the city. In Carrefour, half of the buildings were destroyed in the worst-affected areas. Roughly half the structures were destroyed in Gressier.

See also
 Arrondissements of Haiti
 Communes of Haiti

References

Arrondissements of Haiti
Ouest (department)